Schaumburg is a village located mostly in Cook County and partly in DuPage County in northeastern Illinois, United States. Per the 2020 Census, the population was 78,723. It is part of the Golden Corridor.

In 2018, Money magazine ranked the Village of Schaumburg the Best Place to Live in Illinois. In 2017, Money ranked Schaumburg the 9th-best place to live in the United States.

Along with Bolingbrook, Schaumburg has one of Illinois's two IKEA stores. It also is home to the Woodfield Mall, one of the largest shopping malls in the United States, which features almost 300 stores and restaurants. Schaumburg's transition from a rural community to a suburban city began with Alfred Campanelli's first large-scale suburban-style development in 1959 and Woodfield Mall's opening on September 9, 1971.

Schaumburg is bordered by Hoffman Estates and Palatine to the north, Inverness in northwest, Rolling Meadows to the northeast, Elk Grove Village to the southeast, Roselle to the south, Hanover Park to the southwest, and Streamwood to the west.

History

19th century
The village of Schaumburg was incorporated on March 7, 1956, but the heritage of Schaumburg dates back to much earlier times when the first inhabitants of the area were members of the Sauk, Fox, Potawatomi, and Kickapoo Native American tribes. By the mid-19th century, settlers first began to arrive from Bonn, Germany and the eastern United States. Many of the Germans came from Schaumburg-Lippe, a small princely state now in Lower Saxony.

Legend has it that one of the earliest settlers was Trumball Kent from Oswego, New York. Kent, a "Yankee", as settlers from New England were called in the west, farmed property in the northeast corner of the township. Another Yankee was Horace Williams, who owned substantial lands but lived in the hamlet of Palatine in Palatine Township. Ernst Schween settled in 1835 not far from what used to be called Olde Schaumburg Centre, in what was then and is now known as Sarah's Grove. Another early settler in Schaumburg Township was German-born Johann Sunderlage. According to one legend, Sunderlage was a member of a survey team that divided Cook County into townships around 1833; according to another legend, he worked on a survey team on the Joliet canal. He liked the area so much that, upon completion of the project, he returned to Europe and brought his family and friends from Germany and settled in the area now known as Hoffman Estates in Schaumburg Township around 1836. His home still stands in its original location.

Sunderlage and his family occupied their land in the township until the federal land sale of 1842 allowed them to buy the property and obtain the deed. Sunderlage and Kent represented the predominant groups that settled Schaumburg Township in its early days. In 1840, 56 percent of the township households originated from the eastern United States, while 28 percent were German-born. By the 1850s, the population mix had changed to 28 percent "Yankee" and 48 percent German.

By 1870, Schaumburg Township had become completely German. Land records show that most of the property in the township was owned by German immigrants or their descendants. This pattern emerged as many Yankee "settlers" continued to travel west for the promise of newly opened lands on the Great Plains. The land they owned in Schaumburg was then purchased by German-born immigrants.

Schaumburg Township remained almost exclusively under German ownership until the Great Depression of the 1930s. The Depression caused the foreclosure on some German-owned farms which were then purchased by non-German individuals and companies. Nonetheless, German heritage remained important in the area. German was the first language of the majority of households until the 1950s.

St. Peter Lutheran Church, the community's oldest Christian church, had services in German as late as 1970. The church remains as a museum, as does the second church of this congregation. Services were first held at the then-existing Rohlwing-Fenz store, at the southwest corner of the intersection of Schaumburg Road and Roselle Road, until their first church building was completed in 1847. The pastor was Francis Hoffman, who walked from the Bensenville area to hold the Christian religious meetings in Schaumburg. He later served as Lieutenant Governor of Illinois. When he retired from the church's ministry, he moved to Wisconsin where he operated an experimental farm and edited a German-language agricultural newspaper. Other people of the area who were notable in the 1840s included Quindel, Winkelhake, Moeller, Fenz, Kastning, Lichthardt, Meyer, Rohlwing, Thies, Scheiderling, Hattendorf, Nerge, and Freise.

Sarah's Grove
The original 1842 township survey names the grove (immediately west of the center of the township, in sections 21 and 22) as Sarah's Grove. Three families lived near a grove of woods on the northwest end of the township, and each family had a woman named Sarah (Sarah McChesney, Sarah Frisbe, and Sarah Smith). At a township meeting in 1850, citizens debated new names for the town. A wealthy landowner named Friedrich Heinrich Nerge, at one point during the meeting, slammed his fist on the table and yelled in Low German, "Schaumburg schall et heiten!" (The English translation: "It will be called Schaumburg!"). At that point, the township became officially called Schaumburg.

The name was taken from Grafschaft Schaumburg (Schaumburg County) in Germany, then a part of Hessen-Kassel, now in Lower Saxony. Most of the township's German settlers were from Schaumburg; many were born in the parish of Apelern. Some came from Hannover, but the people of Schaumburg had more influence.

Schaumburg Township prospered during its early days. The area's main occupation was farming, with potato growing, dairy products and raising cattle as main sources of income. The land was a very large meadow surrounded by extensive wilderness. Wildlife such as geese, ducks, quail, prairie chickens, rabbits, pheasant and deer were abundant. 
In 1858, a small market area emerged at what is now the intersection of Schaumburg and Roselle roads. Schaumburg Center was the market center for the surrounding agricultural producers. It included two general stores, four cheese factories, a cobbler, a tailor, a wagon maker, and a blacksmith.

Most of the early growth in the northeast region of Illinois occurred along the Fox River Valley and the major rail lines. Since neither of these transportation networks served Schaumburg Township at the time, the township remained rather isolated. Few roads existed, and several of those were often impassable. To reach a large market, Schaumburg farmers had to travel  in ox-drawn or horse-drawn wagons to Chicago, which only had about 35,000 inhabitants at that time.

20th century

In 1900, a 50-year anniversary brochure reported the following account: "Schaumburg has the reputation of being the model community of Cook County. Also, the town of Schaumburg is an example of a community for all other towns in Cook County and probably in other counties, too. Schaumburg is prompt in the payment of its taxes; it supports churches and schools; it has also the best roads in the land and – Schaumburg has never had a jail. Finally, it is not just for the settlers only, but also for foreigners."

In 1925, O. D. Jennings, the founder of what was once one of the largest manufacturers of slot machines in the United States, purchased a house in the village. It would be his and his wife's home until his death in 1953. On the death of his widow, the house and its surrounding park lands were donated to the village and used as the Village Hall until 1971.

Schaumburg's relative isolation was broken, however, as the automobile became the primary mode of travel. In response to development pressures, the area encompassing what was known as Schaumburg Centre was incorporated in 1956. At the time of incorporation, the village consisted of two square miles and a population of 130 residents.

Incorporation enabled the village to control its growth and development. Early village leaders are credited with the foresight and planning that has made later economic growth possible. The original comprehensive plan adopted by the Village Board in 1961 reserved large tracts of land for industrial, commercial, and office development; mostly the Woodfield area surrounding what is now Woodfield Mall. Growth in these sectors has made the village a major employer in the area and the home of Illinois's second-largest retail center.

Schaumburg's expansion during the 1960s changed the character of the community dramatically. Schaumburg was no longer a quiet rural community. In 1959, Alfred Campanelli began construction of the first large residential subdivision in the village, known as Weathersfield. This area contains several thousand single-family homes built in 22 stages over two decades. In total, Campanelli constructed over 6,800 housing units or approximately 20% of the village's housing stock. Schaumburg's YMCA is named after him.

In 1967, an apartment complex called International Village (located at the intersection of Meacham and Algonquin roads) was built as Schaumburg's first residential area not entirely occupied by single-family homes. The following year, Motorola began to construct its corporate headquarters across the street.

During this time, country singer Bob Atcher ("You Are My Sunshine"), who had become known on WLS' National Barn Dance radio program, became the Schaumburg village president. He held that position until 1975.

In the 1970s, the tremendous growth that had taken place in the previous decade continued. By 1970, the village population had grown to 18,730. That same year, a second expressway, Interstate 290, opened on the eastern boundary of the village. This provided another link to Chicago and further enhanced its stature in the eyes of the region's many developers. The following year, Woodfield Mall opened in Schaumburg. During the remainder of the decade, Schaumburg experienced phenomenal commercial, industrial and residential development.

In 1978, the Village Board formally established the Olde Schaumburg Centre Overlay District to preserve the character of the area located at the intersection of Schaumburg and Roselle roads. The Olde Schaumburg Centre Commission, also established in 1978, reviews new development and restoration projects in the district to ensure the continued historic appeal of the area.

During the early- and mid-1980s, development focused on large corporate office buildings in the emerging "Woodfield Center" along Golf Road. The late 1980s were characterized by the vast expansion of small manufacturing and warehouse uses in the industrial and business parks in the village's northeast and southwest quadrants. Other development such as large manufacturing facilities, commercial retail centers, and large suite hotels boomed in the 1980s. Schaumburg was profiled in Joel Garreau's 1991 book about edge cities as, "a suburb conforming to a new form of urban development in which large concentrations of jobs exist, though outside the traditional downtown city centers."

By 1990, Schaumburg's population was increasing at a slower rate as the land available for residential development was rapidly disappearing. The population in 1990 had risen to 68,586, an increase of 15,281 since 1980. Although this was still an impressive growth rate, it was apparent that Schaumburg was nearing its residential capacity within the terms of current land management.

Office development in the 1990s had also slowed. The once booming office market slumped due to the large supply of office space in the northwest suburbs and the limited demand by typical users in the financial, insurance, and real estate sectors. However, the Schaumburg commercial market enjoyed substantial expansion during this period. Since 1990, Schaumburg has witnessed the development of 2 million square feet (180,000 m2) of commercial space, including a variety of retail uses. Another mall named One Schaumburg Place and a retail area called Village Green were built in the early 1990s. One Schaumburg Place quickly lost most of its stores, eventually left only a theater and, a few years later, was completely reconstructed into a walkthrough shopping area with an AMC Theater and GameWorks as its major businesses. Around the same time, Woodfield Mall underwent a major redesign, adding retail space and removing previous attractions. A Nordstrom was added to one branch of the mall as well, increasing the number of anchor stores to five. Woodfield Mall is now an international tourist attraction, harboring visitors every day from locations as far away as Japan. IKEA, an internationally known home furnishings store, opened its  Schaumburg location near Woodfield in the late 1990s.

In the mid-1990s, many restaurants came to the village of Schaumburg: Pizzeria Uno (tourism version), Outback Steakhouse, Chevy's, Champps, Chandlers, P.F. Chang's, Hooters, Rainforest Café, Red Lobster, Joe's Crab Shack, Benihana, and Maggiano's opened in the area during this time.

In 1994, the village bought the Schaumburg Regional Airport from its formerly-private owners and refurbished it with 90% of the funds for the purchase and refurbishment acquired by federal grant, 5% from the State of Illinois, 2.5% Cook County and the village putting up the remaining 2.5%, with the village gaining 100% control of the property.

The village finalized the purchase of the Town Square shopping center (also previously known as Olde Town Centre) in 1995, and began a slow, but now complete, redevelopment. The  site at the southwest corner of Schaumburg and Roselle roads has been transformed into a diverse development offering several stores, the Schaumburg Township District Library (relocated from Bethel Lane), a few other offices and services, such as temp agencies, and a public amphitheater set in a walk-through area that was designed to be available as a gathering point for citizens. The area also still includes the Trickster Gallery, a museum celebrating the heritage of the Native Americans indigenous to the area. The new development was designed to be "the new downtown", but this largely did not catch on and is primarily used by Schaumburg's government.

Minor league baseball came to the village in the spring of 1999. Alexian Field (named for Alexian Brothers Hospital in the adjacent Elk Grove Village), a 7,000-seat baseball stadium, was built in partnership with the Schaumburg Park District. Alexian Field was home to the Schaumburg Flyers, a member of the independent Northern League. The Northern League split after the 2010 season with several teams joining three other independent professional leagues. Alexian Field was without a professional team for the 2011 season but in 2012 became home to the Frontier League's Schaumburg Boomers and was renamed Boomers Stadium.

21st century
In 2000, the village purchased  next to a short, independent stretch of Meacham Road. This was developed into the Renaissance Schaumburg Hotel & Convention Center.

Schaumburg's population as of the year 2000 was 75,386 according to U.S. Census.

Geography
Schaumburg is located at  (42.0302057, −88.0838750). 

Its elevation varies between 750 and 850 feet above sea level, with a high point of 850 feet at the intersection of Schaumburg Road and Webster Lane. Schaumburg serves as the headwaters of the West Branch Dupage River, which drains the central and western portions of the village, flowing to the southwest. The West Branch of the Salt Creek drains the eastern portion of the village, flowing eastward into Busse Lake.

Demographics
As of the 2020 census there were 78,723 people, 30,249 households, and 18,707 families residing in the village. The racial makeup of the village was 57.55% White, 4.28% African American, 0.43% Native American, 26.46% Asian, 0.02% Pacific Islander, 4.26% from other races, and 7.00% from two or more races. Hispanic or Latino of any race were 10.50% of the population.

There were 30,249 households, out of which 52.12% had children under the age of 18 living with them, 50.38% were married couples living together, 8.34% had a female householder with no husband present, and 38.16% were non-families. 32.98% of all households were made up of individuals, and 10.37% had someone living alone who was 65 years of age or older. The average household size was 3.15 and the average family size was 2.41.

The village's age distribution consisted of 22.7% under the age of 18, 5.3% from 18 to 24, 31.7% from 25 to 44, 24.7% from 45 to 64, and 15.5% who were 65 years of age or older. The median age was 38.5 years. For every 100 females, there were 94.5 males. For every 100 females age 18 and over, there were 90.9 males.

The median income for a household in the village was $82,387, and the median income for a family was $98,640. Males had a median income of $63,479 versus $43,286 for females. The per capita income for the village was $42,303. About 4.4% of families and 5.7% of the population were below the poverty line, including 6.8% of those under age 18 and 5.6% of those age 65 or over.

Note: the US Census treats Hispanic/Latino as an ethnic category. This table excludes Latinos from the racial categories and assigns them to a separate category. Hispanics/Latinos can be of any race.

Village government

Staff salaries 
Within the staff of the village of Schaumburg, 51 employees earn over $100,000. The village manager makes $240,770. Meanwhile, the median household income in Schaumburg is $75,658, according to the Illinois Policy Institute, meaning that the village manager makes 218 percent more than the median household income.

Economy
Companies headquartered in Schaumburg include Zurich North America, Motorola Solutions and Perdoceo Education Corporation the former Career Education Corporation.

As of 2011 many Japanese companies have their U.S. headquarters in Schaumburg and Hoffman Estates.

Top employers
According to the Village's website, the top employers in the village are:

Transportation 
Schaumburg has a station on Metra's Milwaukee District/West Line, which goes between Elgin and Chicago Union Station. The Suburban Transit Access Route (STAR Line) originally planned to have two stations at the IKEA department store and on Roselle Road near the north of the village, but those plans were shelved by Metra in 2012. The only current station is near Boomers Stadium. Additionally, the Schaumburg Regional Airport, a small general aviation airport, is located along Irving Park Road just west of Roselle Road. Pace's I-90 Express stops in Schaumburg near the Woodfield Mall with busses to Rosemont Transportation Center (where passengers can connect with the Blue Line to Chicago) and Elgin. Pace also offers dial-a-ride bus service that is open to the general public. Reservations must be made a minimum of 90 minutes in advance.

Education
Public schools in Schaumburg are funded by property taxes, not sales tax.

The main public school district is Community Consolidated School District 54. The elementary schools of district 54, only some of which are in Schaumburg, have received awards such as the Blue Ribbon Awards and Teachers Who Excel award. The schools in the area also have Special Education and bilingual classes, as well as programs for the gifted.

Schaumburg is part of Township High School District 211, which has five high schools: Schaumburg High School, Hoffman Estates High School, Conant High School, Fremd High School and Palatine High School. Schaumburg High School recently finished remodeling the outside of the building and adding extra classrooms, science labs and faculty offices. District 211 also completed a similar project at Conant High School .

Schaumburg also has a number of private and religious schools, such as Schaumburg Christian School, St. Peter Lutheran School, St. Hubert Catholic School, Our Lady of Annabelle Grace Catholic Academy, and Hadi School of Excellence.

Universities

Not-for-profit 
 The Illinois Institute of Art – Schaumburg campus (formerly for-profit)
 Roosevelt University's campus in Schaumburg is the largest four-year university in Chicago's Northwest suburbs, serving approximately 2,500 students. The campus is located in the former headquarters office building of the Pure Oil Company. Roosevelt converted the building into a comprehensive campus in 1996. The Albert A. Robin Campus is home to the Doctor of Pharmacy program, which accepted its inaugural class in July 2011. Roosevelt's PharmD program is the Midwest's only three-year, year-round program of its kind. In July 2014, it achieved full accreditation for its Doctor of Pharmacy curriculum. The campus is also home to the university's only PhD program (Industrial-Organizational Psychology), which began in August 2012.

For-profit 
 The Lake Forest Graduate School of Management's Schaumburg campus, an arm of Argosy University (formerly the Illinois Institute of Psychology)
 American InterContinental University

Public library
Schaumburg Township District Library has a main branch in Schaumburg and two smaller branches in Hanover Park and Hoffman Estates. The complete collection of materials totals more than 560,000 as of April 2017. The Library is a member of Reaching Across Illinois Library System, which allows people with a card from any member library to use the same card at any other member library. Schaumburg Township District Library is one of the largest libraries in the country with multiple meeting and discussion rooms; a high-tech Teen Place for youth ages 12–19; a kidsZone with materials, activities and play space for kids; a newly created Workshop for all ages to explore, create and learn; and a recently renovated Commons area with room for all ages to read, work and collaborate. The Library also has a drive-up window for easy drop-off and pick-up of materials. It offers enriching and entertaining programs all year long, such as book discussions, technology classes, ESL classes, DIY workshops and informational lectures.

Notable people
Lou Clarizio, former Negro league outfielder
Susan Downey (née Levin), producer and wife of actor Robert Downey Jr., 1991 Schaumburg High School valedictorian
Jason Guida, professional mixed martial artist
Matt Haag, professional Call of Duty player
Kurt Kittner, former NFL quarterback for the Chicago Bears and Atlanta Falcons
Jessica Lu, actress and model
Shane Madej, internet personality, writer and producer, known for Buzzfeed Unsolved and Watcher on YouTube.
Chris Mueller, soccer player who plays as a winger for Chicago Fire FC in  Major League Soccer and the United States national team.
Adwar Mousa, Assyrian singer-songwriter

Parks
In the spring of 2017, the Schaumburg Park District opened its newest children's playground Bison's Bluff Nature Playground. Bison's Bluff, a part of the Spring Valley Nature Center & Heritage Farm, is designed to engage children in a natural setting with a play area that consists of natural materials (logs, boulders, sand, water, etc.) as well as manufactured features that mimic a rock bluff and cliff face, fallen logs, and flowing stream. The stated goal of Bison's Bluff is to inspire today's youth to remain active, develop agility, learn resilience, discover the benefits of cooperation and experimentation, solve problems, and learn to navigate the world around them confidently.(2017)

References

Notes

External links

 
 Schaumburg Park District

 
Chicago metropolitan area
Populated places established in 1956
Villages in Cook County, Illinois
Villages in DuPage County, Illinois
Villages in Illinois
1956 establishments in Illinois